"Scientific Integrity in Policymaking: An Investigation into the Bush Administration's Misuse of Science" is the title of a report published by the Union of Concerned Scientists in February, 2004. The report was the culmination of an investigation of the Bush administration's objectivity in science, and ultimately a criticism thereof. (After it was published, the report's existence was fairly well-publicized by the United States' mass media.)

"Suppression and distortion of research findings" 

A central thesis of the report, according to the Executive Summary (on page 2 of the text), was that the Bush administration had behaved in ways considered to be consistent with the following three situations.

 Epidemic altering and concealing of scientific information by senior officials in various federal agencies
 Active censorship of scientific information that the administration considered threatening to its own philosophies
 Restriction of the ability of government-supported scientists to freely communicate scientific ideas related to "sensitive" issues

"An unprecedented pattern of behavior" 

In "Part III", the text of the report posits that the aforementioned activities are unprecedented in the history of the United States. The report lists the following persons and organization who had supposedly acted or made statements to support this claim.

This list is sorted first by category, then by the order in which the persons or organizations are mentioned in the report.

 Organization
 REP America
 Persons
 Ruckelshaus, William
 Train, Russell
 Panofsky, Dr. Wolfgang H. K.
 Goldberger, Dr. Marvin
 Scarlett, Dr. Margaret
 Kennedy, Donald
 Bromley, Dr. D. Allan
 Branscomb, Professor Lewis M.
 Goldman, Dr. Lynn

Recommendations by the Union 

Page 29 of the report states: "This behavior by the administration violates the central premise of the scientific method, and is therefore of particularly grave concern to the scientific community." It then goes on, in a short section titled "Conclusions and Recommendations: What's at Stake" at the end of the report, to provide recommendations for "restoring scientific integrity to federal policymaking" (page 30). These recommendations (on pages 30–31) include a suggestion for the President of the United States to issue executive orders, and other actions, that would prevent further "abuse"; for the United States Congress to hold appropriate hearings, consider the consequences of statutory law under its influence, increase the amount of publicly available scientific information, and establish an organization to guide Congress in its deliberations in technical matters; for scientists to raise awareness of the aforementioned issues and provide public policy recommendations; for the public to exercise its political influence in a constructive manner.

Response 
On April 2, 2004, the White House Office of Science and Technology Policy issued a statement by Dr. John Marburger, the director of OSTP, that claims the descriptions of the incidents in the UCS report are all "false," "wrong," or "a distortion." He said he was disappointed with the report and dismissed it as "biased.".

The report's table of contents 

The following is a duplication of the report's table of contents.

 Executive summary
 Part I: Suppression and distortion of research findings at federal agencies
 Distorting and suppressing climate change research
 Censoring information on air quality
 Mercury emissions from power plants
 Addressing multiple air pollutants
 Distorting scientific knowledge on reproductive health issues
 Abstinence-only education
 HIV/AIDS
 Breast cancer
 Suppressing analysis on airborne bacteria
 Misrepresenting evidence on Iraq's aluminum tubes
 Manipulation of science regarding the endangered species act
 Missouri River
 Manipulating the scientific process on forest management
 OMB rulemaking on "peer review"
 Part II: Undermining the quality and integrity of the appointment process
 Industry influence on lead poisoning prevention panel
 Political litmus tests on workplace safety panel
 Non-scientist in senior advisory role to the President
 Underqualified candidates in health advisory roles
 The FDA's Reproductive Health Advisory Committee
 Presidential Advisory Council on HIV/AIDS
 Litmus tests for scientific appointees
 National Institute on Drug Abuse
 Army Science Board
 Dismissal of nuclear weapons and arms control panels
 National Nuclear Security Administration panel
 Arms control panel
 Part III: An unprecedented pattern of behavior
 Disseminating research from federal agencies
 Irregularities in appointments to scientific advisory panels
 Conclusions and recommendations: What's at stake
 Restoring scientific integrity to federal policy making
 Appendices
 EPA memo on climate section of the Report on the Environment
 USDA "sensitive issue" list

Associated Statement "Restoring Scientific Integrity in Policymaking" 
At the time of issue of this report, the UCS released a statement supporting the criticisms detailed in the above report. This statement was originally signed by the 62 prominent scientists listed below. Since that time it has gathered support from more than 12,000 scientists.

Signatories of the original statement include:
 Philip W. Anderson
 David Baltimore
 Paul Berg
 Rosina Bierbaum
 Nicolaas Bloembergen
 Lewis M. Branscomb
 Eric Chivian
 Joel E. Cohen
 James Cronin
 Margaret Davis
 Paul M. Doty
 Paul Ehrlich
 Thomas Eisner
 Christopher Field
 Gerald D. Fischbach
 Val L. Fitch
 Jerry Franklin
 Jerome Friedman
 Richard L. Garwin
 John H. Gibbons
 Marvin L. Goldberger
 Lynn R. Goldman
 Kurt Gottfried
 David Grimes
 Roger Guillemin
 John P. Holdren
 Eric R. Kandel
 Anne Kapuscinski
 Walter Kohn
 Lawrence Krauss
 Neal F. Lane
 Leon M. Lederman
 William Lipscomb
 Jane Lubchenco
 Michael MacCracken
 James J. McCarthy
 Jerry M. Melillo
 Matthew S. Meselson
 David Michaels
 Mario Molina
 Michael Oppenheimer
 Gordon Orians
 W.K.H. Panofsky
 Stuart Pimm
 Ron Pulliam
 Norman F. Ramsey
 Anthony Robbins
 Allan Rosenfield
 F. Sherwood Rowland
 Edwin E. Salpeter
 William Schlesinger
 J. Robert Schrieffer
 Richard Smalley
 Felicia Stewart
 Kevin Trenberth
 Harold E. Varmus
 Steven Weinberg
 E.O. Wilson
 Edward Witten
 George Woodwell
 Donald Wuebbles
 Herbert F. York

External links 

 Restoring Scientific Integrity in Policymaking: The Bush Administration’s Misuse of Science, February 2004
 Scientific Integrity in Policy Making: Further Investigation of the Bush Administration’s Misuse of Science, July 2004
 2004 Scientist Statement on Restoring Scientific Integrity to Federal Policy Making

References

Science in society
George W. Bush administration controversies
Climate change in the United States